Ellis-Schindler House, also known as the Robert Ellis House, is a historic home located at Mishawaka, St. Joseph County, Indiana.  It was built in 1834, and is a -story, rectangular, Greek Revival style frame dwelling.  It has a front gable roof and is sheathed in clapboard siding.  The house was moved to its present location and renovated in 1979.  It is the oldest known existing structure in Mishawaka.

It was listed on the National Register of Historic Places in 1990.

References

Houses on the National Register of Historic Places in Indiana
Greek Revival houses in Indiana
Houses completed in 1834
Houses in St. Joseph County, Indiana
National Register of Historic Places in St. Joseph County, Indiana